Freziera velutina is a species of plant in the Pentaphylacaceae family. It is endemic to Colombia.

References

velutina
Endemic flora of Colombia
Vulnerable plants
Taxonomy articles created by Polbot